Troubled Times is a 2012 album by Cast.

Troubled Times may also refer to:
"Troubled Times", a song by Green Day from their 2016 album Revolution Radio
"Troubled Times", a song by Screaming Trees from their 1992 album Sweet Oblivion
"Troubled Times", a song by Fountains of Wayne from their 1999 album Utopia Parkway
"Troubled Times", a song by Your Vegas from their 2007 album A Town and Two Cities

See also
Time of Troubles, period in Russian history between 1598 and 1613